The third USS Intrepid was a steel-hulled bark in the United States Navy.

Intrepids keel was laid down by the Mare Island Navy Yard at Vallejo, California.  She was launched on 8 October 1904, sponsored by Miss Helen de Young, and commissioned on 16 August 1907.

Intrepid was assigned to the Yerba Buena Training Station at San Francisco, California, for duty until 28 February 1912, when she became the receiving ship at the same station. The latter assignment lasted until 25 January 1914 when Intrepid became the receiving ship at Mare Island Navy Yard, where she was decommissioned 15 October 1914.

In 1920 she again became the receiving ship at Mare Island Navy Yard.

Intrepid was decommissioned on 30 August 1921 and was sold on 20 December 1921 for conversion to a commercial barge for the Hawaiian Dredging Company.

Returned to commercial service after the war, she was wrecked on the north beach of the Columbia River on 23 February 1954 under the ownership of the Independent Iron Works of Oakland, CA, while being towed to Portland, OR, for sale. Her remains are still visible.

References

External links

 Photo gallery at navsource.org

Barques of the United States Navy
1904 ships
Ships built in Vallejo, California
Training ships of the United States Navy